Trøndertun folkehøgskole is a "frilynt folkehøgskole" (not Christian) in Gimse in the village of Melhus in Melhus municipality in Trøndelag county, Norway. The school annually welcomes about 150 students and is owned by "Gauldal Høgskulelag".
Gunnar Andreas Berg is teacher of guitar, Espen Berg teacher of jazz and former Trøndertun student Hans Magnus Ryan (Snah) from Motorpsycho is a guest teacher at the school. Other teachers at the school are professionally strong with experience as performing artists.

Main subjects of this school are 
Dance
Vocals
Sound Engineering
Jazz
Rock
Guitar

Alumni 
1983-84: Kåre Kolve - saxophone (Voss)
1991-92: Ståle Storløkken - keyboards (Dombås)
1988-89: Lars Håvard Haugen - guitar (Hallingdal)
1991-92: Hans Magnus Ryan - guitar (Trondheim)
1991-92: Håkon Gebhardt - drums (Tromsø)
1997-98: Nikolai Eilertsen - bass guitar (Skotselv)
1997-98: Torstein Lofthus - drums (Øystese)
1999-00: Siri Wålberg - vocals (Oppegård)
2001-02: Isak Strand - drums & electronics (Bergen)
2006-07: Henrik B. Michelsen - sound engineering (Bergen)
2007-08: Jonas Alaska - vocal & guitar (Åmli)

References

External links 
Trøndertun folkehøgskole

Folk high schools in Norway
Melhus